WASP-16 is a magnitude 11 yellow dwarf main sequence star, with characteristics similar to the Sun, located in the Virgo constellation.

Planetary system
In 2009, a planet of the star was announced by the SuperWASP project. It appears to be another hot Jupiter type exoplanet.

See also
 SuperWASP
 List of extrasolar planets

References

External links
 SuperWASP Homepage
 

Virgo (constellation)
G-type main-sequence stars
Planetary systems with one confirmed planet
Planetary transit variables
J14184392-2016317
16